Gori shola is a locale in Ooty famous for its water reservoir. It is located off the road from Ooty to Doddabetta amidst the Doddabetta forests. It is a tourist spot in the town, which provides a pleasing look of the surroundings from the top of the reservoir.

Dargah
A Dargah has been built on top of a hill in Gori shola. It is the final resting place of a saint called Hazrath Peer Syed Hassan Shah. The Dargah, which is several decades old, has gained popularity over the years and is now a popular pilgrimage centre among Muslims in and around the Nilgiris district. A popular festival called the urs Hazrath Peer Syed Hassan Shah Khadri is celebrated in the Dargah annually.

Littering concerns
Gori shola has had problems with people littering discarded items like cigarette packets, liquor bottles and plastic bottles and lighting bon-fires in the area. This has been a concern for local residents and environmentalists, since the area adjoins a reserve forest and a water body.

See also
 Government Rose Garden, Ooty
 Government Botanical Gardens, Udagamandalam
 Ooty Lake
 Ooty Golf Course
 Stone House, Ooty
 Ooty Radio Telescope
 Mariamman temple, Ooty
 St. Stephen's Church, Ooty

References

Tourist attractions in Ooty
Tourist attractions in Nilgiris district
Geography of Ooty